The 1941 Ohio Northern Polar Bears football team was an American football team that represented Ohio Northern University in the Ohio Athletic Conference (OAC) during the 1941 college football season. In their 11th and final season under head coach Harris Lamb, the Polar Bears compiled a 6–1–1 record (5–0 against OAC opponents) and outscored opponents by a total of 110 to 40.

Schedule

References

Ohio Northern
Ohio Northern Polar Bears football seasons
Ohio Northern football